RAPID is a high-level programming language used to control ABB industrial robots. RAPID was introduced along with S4 Control System in 1994 by ABB, superseding the ARLA programming language.

Features in the language include:

 Routine parameters:
 Procedures - used as a subprogram.
 Functions - return a value of a specific type and are used as an argument of an instruction.
 Trap routines - a means of responding to interrupts.
 Arithmetic and logical expressions
 Automatic error handling
 Modular programs
 Multi tasking

See also 
KUKA Robot Language

External links
 "Programming in Rapid (Reference)"
 "ABB RobotStudio Manual (With Rapid Reference)"

Further reading
 ABB Robotics Products AB, RAPID Reference Manual

ABB
Programming languages created in 1994
Robot programming languages